The Shaker Museum at South Union is a museum of Shaker history located at the site of the South Union Shaker Village in Auburn, Kentucky, United States. 

The village was established by the Shakers in 1807 and closed in 1922. The museum is located in the 1824 Centre Family dwelling, an 1824 40-room Centre House, filled with original artifacts exemplifying the Shakers' craftsmanship and unique way of life.

The museum is on the South Union Shakertown Historic Trail, included in the US National Register of Historic Places.  The Shaker Museum at South Union is a non-profit educational organization devoted to preserving the Shaker culture and legacy.

References

Further reading
Kelly, Andrew (August 2015). Kentucky by Design: The Decorative Arts and American Culture. Lexington, Kentucky, University Press of Kentucky.

External links 
 Museum website
 Shaker music history

Historic districts on the National Register of Historic Places in Kentucky
Residential buildings completed in 1824
Shaker communities or museums
Open-air museums in Kentucky
Religious museums in Kentucky
Museums in Logan County, Kentucky
National Register of Historic Places in Logan County, Kentucky